Ainderby Quernhow is a village and civil parish in the Hambleton District of North Yorkshire, England.  The village is situated on the B6267 Thirsk to Masham road just east of the A1(M) and is about five miles west of Thirsk. The population of the civil parish was estimated at 70 in 2014.

The Quernhow at Ainderby is a small mound on the nearby Roman Road which marked the boundary between the parishes of Ainderby and Middleton Quernhow. The mound at Ainderby Quernhow was demolished to make way for the upgrading of the A1(M) and its history is commemorated in a stone laid down in the grounds of the Quernhow Café which now adjoins the A6055.

Ainderby Mires and Ainderby Steeple are also in the district, the latter refers to the local church spire, the former to marshy mires.

Ainderby is a place name originally meant village belonging to Eindrithi, a Viking whose name meant 'sole-ruler'. Quernhow, which has also been spelled Whernhowe and Whernou means mill-hill. The first element derives from the Old Norse word  kvern meaning a mill stone. How, deriving from the Old Norse word  haugr ,  means a hill.  How is a common element in Yorkshire place names but rare in County Durham.

Popular culture
Ainderby Quernhow is twice mentioned in popular culture; once in Douglas Adams' The Meaning of Liff (as a word describing those who miss using the word 'gay' in its historical sense) and by The Independent as sounding like an actor who 'specializes in playing vacuous tennis-playing aristocrats.'

References

External links 

 
 Map of Ainderby Quernhow showing house names

Villages in North Yorkshire
Civil parishes in North Yorkshire